The 1916–17 Hong Kong First Division League season was the 9th since its establishment.

Overview
Royal Engineers won the championship.

References
RSSSF

1916-17
1916–17 domestic association football leagues
1916 in Hong Kong
1917 in Hong Kong